Kapono is a Hawaiian name. ka ("the") + pono ("good, upright")

People 

 Henry Kapono, American musician
 Jason Kapono (born 1981), American basketball player
 Kapono Beamer, American musician
 Zach Kapono Wilson (born 1999), American football player

See also 
 Kapon
 Kapone